Thomas Wright "Fats" Waller (May 21, 1904 – December 15, 1943) was an American jazz pianist, organist, composer, violinist, singer, and comedic entertainer. His innovations in the Harlem stride style laid much of the basis for modern jazz piano. His best-known compositions, "Ain't Misbehavin'" and "Honeysuckle Rose", were inducted into the Grammy Hall of Fame in 1984 and 1999. Waller copyrighted over 400 songs, many of them co-written with his closest collaborator, Andy Razaf. Razaf described his partner as "the soul of melody... a man who made the piano sing... both big in body and in mind... known for his generosity... a bubbling bundle of joy". It is likely that he composed many more popular songs than he has been credited with: when in financial difficulties he had a habit of selling songs to other writers and performers who claimed them as their own.

Waller started playing the piano at the age of six and became a professional organist at 15. By the age of 18, he was a recording artist. He was a prolific songwriter, and one of the most popular performers of his era, touring internationally and achieving critical and commercial success in the United States and Europe. He died from pneumonia, aged 39.

Early life
Waller was the seventh child of 11 (five of whom survived childhood) born to Adeline Locket Waller, a musician, and Reverend Edward Martin Waller, a trucker and pastor in New York City. He started playing the piano when he was six and graduated to playing the organ at his father's church four years later. His mother instructed him in his youth, and he attended other music lessons, paying for them by working in a grocery store. Waller attended DeWitt Clinton High School for one semester, but left school at 15 to work as an organist at the Lincoln Theater in Harlem, where he earned $32 a week. Within 12 months he had composed his first rag. He was the prize pupil and later the friend and colleague of the stride pianist James P. Johnson. Waller also studied composition at the Juilliard School with Carl Bohm and Leopold Godowsky. His mother died on November 10, 1920 from a stroke due to diabetes.

Waller's first recordings, "Muscle Shoals Blues" and "Birmingham Blues", were made in October 1922 for Okeh Records. That year, he also made his first player piano roll, "Got to Cool My Doggies Now". Waller's first published composition, "Squeeze Me", was published in 1924.

Career
Pianist and composer Oscar Levant called Waller "the black Horowitz". Working with his long-time songwriting partner, lyricist Andy Razaf, Fats also wrote the music and/or performed in several successful Broadway musicals, including 1928's "Keep Shufflin'", 1929's "Hot Chocolates" and (with lyricist George Marion, Jr.) 1943's "Early To Bed".

Waller is believed to have composed many novelty tunes in the 1920s and 1930s and sold them for small sums, attributed to another composer and lyricist.

Standards attributed to Waller, sometimes controversially, include "I Can't Give You Anything but Love, Baby". The song was made famous by Adelaide Hall in the Broadway show Blackbirds of 1928.

Biographer Barry Singer conjectured that this song was written by Waller and lyricist Andy Razaf and provided a description of the sale given by Waller to the New York Post in 1929he sold the song for $500 to a white songwriter for use in a financially successful show (consistent with Jimmy McHugh's contributions to Harry Delmar's Revels, 1927, and then to Blackbirds of 1928). He noted that early handwritten manuscripts in the Dana Library Institute of Jazz Studies of "Spreadin' Rhythm Around" (Jimmy McHugh 1935) are in Waller's hand. Jazz historian Paul S. Machlin commented that the Singer conjecture has "considerable [historical] justification". According to a biography by Waller's son Maurice, Waller told his son never to play the song within earshot because he had to sell it when he needed money. Maurice Waller wrote that his father objected to hearing "On the Sunny Side of the Street" on the radio.

The anonymous sleeve notes on the 1960 RCA Victor album Handful of Keys state that Waller copyrighted over 400 songs, many of them co-written with his closest collaborator, Andy Razaf. Razaf described his partner as "the soul of melody...a man who made the piano sing...both big in body and in mind... known for his generosity... a bubbling bundle of joy". In the same notes are comments by clarinetist Gene Sedric, who recorded with Waller in the 1930s. "Fats was the most relaxed man I ever saw in a studio, and so he made everybody else relaxed. After a balance had been taken, we'd just need one take to make a side, unless it was a kind of difficult number."

Waller played with Nathaniel Shilkret, Gene Austin, Erskine Tate, Fletcher Henderson, McKinney's Cotton Pickers, and Adelaide Hall.

On one occasion his playing seemed to have put him at risk of injury. Waller was kidnapped in Chicago while leaving a performance in 1926. Four men bundled him into a car and took him to the Hawthorne Inn, owned by Al Capone. Waller was ordered inside the building and found a party taking place. With a gun to his back, he was pushed towards a piano and told to play. A terrified Waller realized he was the "surprise guest" at Capone's birthday party and was relieved that the kidnappers had no intention of killing him.

In 1926, Waller began his recording association with the Victor Talking Machine Company/RCA Victor, his principal record company for the rest of his life, with the organ solos "St. Louis Blues" and his composition "Lenox Avenue Blues". Although he recorded with several groups, including Morris's Hot Babes (1927), Fats Waller's Buddies (1929) (one of the earliest multiracial groups to record), and McKinney's Cotton Pickers (1929), his most important contribution to the Harlem stride piano tradition was a series of solo recordings of his compositions: "Handful of Keys", "Smashing Thirds", "Numb Fumblin'", and "Valentine Stomp" (1929). After sessions with Ted Lewis (1931), Jack Teagarden (1931) and Billy Banks' Rhythmakers (1932), he began in May 1934 the voluminous series of recordings with a small band known as Fats Waller and his Rhythm. This six-piece group usually included Herman Autrey (sometimes replaced by Bill Coleman or John "Bugs" Hamilton), Gene Sedric or Rudy Powell, and Al Casey.

Waller wrote "Squeeze Me" (1919), "Keepin' Out of Mischief Now", "Ain't Misbehavin'" (1929), "Blue Turning Grey Over You", "I've Got a Feeling I'm Falling" (1929), "Honeysuckle Rose" (1929) and "Jitterbug Waltz" (1942). He composed stride piano display pieces such as "Handful of Keys", "Valentine Stomp" and "Viper's Drag".

He enjoyed success touring the United Kingdom and Ireland in the 1930s, appearing on one of the first BBC television broadcasts on September 30, 1938. While in Britain, Waller also recorded a number of songs for EMI on their Compton Theatre organ located in their Abbey Road Studios in St John's Wood. He appeared in several feature films and short subject films, most notably Stormy Weather in 1943, which was released July 21, just months before his death. For the hit Broadway show Hot Chocolates, he and Razaf wrote "(What Did I Do to Be So) Black and Blue" (1929), which became a hit for Ethel Waters and Louis Armstrong.

Waller performed Bach organ pieces for small groups on occasion. He influenced many pre-bebop jazz pianists; Count Basie and Erroll Garner both revived his hit songs. In addition to his playing, Waller was known for his many humorous quips during his performances.

Between 1926 and the end of 1927, Waller recorded a series of pipe organ solo records. These represent the first time syncopated jazz compositions were performed on a full-sized church organ. In April 1927, Waller played organ at the Vendome in Chicago for movies alongside Louis Armstrong, where his organ-playing was praised for "witty cueing" and "eccentric stop coupling."

Waller's Victor recording of "A Little Bit Independent", written by Joe Burke and Edgar Leslie, was No. 1 on Your Hit Parade for two weeks in 1935. He also charted with "Whose Honey Are You?", "Lulu's Back in Town", "Sweet and Low", "Truckin'", "Rhythm and Romance", "Sing an Old Fashioned Song to a Young Sophisticated Lady", "West Wind", "All My Life", "It's a Sin to Tell a Lie", "Let's Sing Again", "Cross Patch", "You're Not the Kind", "Bye Bye Baby", "You're Laughing at Me", "I Love to Whistle", "Good for Nothing", "Two Sleepy People", and "Little Curly Hair in a Highchair".

Broadway musicals 

Later in Waller's career, he had the distinction of becoming the first African-American songwriter to compose a hit Broadway musical that was seen by a mostly white audience. Broadway producer Richard Kollmar's hiring of Waller to create the 1943 musical Early to Bed was recalled in a 2016 essay about Waller by John McWhorter, an American academic and linguist who is Associate Professor of English and Comparative Literature at Columbia University.Even as late as 1943, the idea of a black composer writing the score for a standard-issue white show was unheard of. When Broadway performer and producer Richard Kollmar began planning Early to Bed, his original idea was for Waller to perform in it as a comic character, not to write the music. Waller was, after all, as much a comedian as a musician. Comedy rarely dates well, but almost 80 years later, his comments and timing during "Your Feet's Too Big" are as funny as anything on Comedy Central, and he nearly walks away with the movie Stormy Weather with just one musical scene and a bit of mugging later on, despite the competition of Bill "Bojangles" Robinson, Lena Horne, and the Nicholas Brothers.

Kollmar's original choice for composer [of Early to Bed] was Ferde Grofé, best known as the orchestrator of George Gershwin's "Rhapsody in Blue," whose signature compositions were portentous concert suites. But Grofé withdrew, and it is to Kollmar's credit that he realized that he had a top-rate pop-song composer available in Waller. Waller's double duty as composer and performer was short-lived. During a cash crisis and in an advanced state of intoxication, Waller threatened to leave the production unless Kollmar bought the rights to his Early to Bed music for $1,000. (This was typical of Waller, who often sold melodies for quick cash when in his cups. The evidence suggests, for example, that the standards "I Can't Give You Anything but Love" and "On the Sunny Side of the Street" were Waller tunes.) Waller came to his senses the next day, but Kollmar decided that his drinking habits made him too risky a proposition for eight performances a week. From then on, Waller was the show's composer only, with lyrics by George Marion, whose best-remembered work today is the script for the Astaire-Rogers film The Gay Divorcée.

Six months after the premiere of Early to Bed, it was still playing in a Broadway theater; at that point newspapers reported Waller's premature death.

Personal life
Waller married Edith Hatch in 1920, with whom he had his first son, Thomas Waller Jr., in 1921. In 1923 Hatch divorced Waller. Waller married Anita Rutherford in 1926. Together, they had a son, Maurice Thomas Waller, born on September 10, 1927. In 1928 Waller and Rutherford had their second son, Ronald Waller.

In 1938, Waller was one of the first African Americans to purchase a home in the Addisleigh Park section of St. Albans, Queens, a New York City community with racially restrictive covenants. After his purchase, and litigation in the New York State courts, many prosperous African Americans followed, including many jazz artists, such as Count Basie, Lena Horne, Ella Fitzgerald, and Milt Hinton.

Death and descendants
Waller contracted pneumonia and died on December 15, 1943, while traveling aboard the famous cross-country Los Angeles–Chicago train the Super Chief near Kansas City, Missouri. His final recording session was with an interracial group in Detroit, Michigan, that included white trumpeter Don Hirleman. Waller was returning to New York City from Los Angeles, after the smash success of Stormy Weather, and a successful engagement at the Zanzibar Room in Santa Monica, California, during which he had fallen ill. More than 4,200 people were estimated to have attended his funeral at Abyssinian Baptist Church in Harlem, which prompted Adam Clayton Powell Jr., who delivered the eulogy, to say that Fats Waller "always played to a packed house." Afterwards, he was cremated and his ashes were scattered over Harlem from an airplane piloted by an unidentified African American World War I aviator.

One descendant is professional football player Darren Waller, who is Fats' great-grandson.

Revival and awards
A Broadway musical showcasing Waller tunes entitled Ain't Misbehavin' was produced in 1978 and featured Nell Carter, Andre de Shields, Armelia McQueen, Ken Page, and Charlaine Woodard. (The show and Nell Carter won Tony Awards.) The show opened at the Longacre Theatre and ran for more than 1600 performances. It was revived on Broadway in 1988 at the Ambassador Theatre with the original Broadway Cast. Performed by five African-American actors, the show included such songs as "Honeysuckle Rose", "This Joint Is Jumpin'", and "Ain't Misbehavin'".

Recordings of Fats Waller were inducted into the Grammy Hall of Fame which is a special Grammy Award established in 1973 to honour recordings that are at least 25 years old and that have "qualitative or historical significance".

Probably the most talented pianist to keep the music of "Fats" Waller alive in the years after his death was Ralph Sutton, who focused his career on playing stride piano. Sutton was a great admirer of Waller, saying "I've never heard a piano man swing any better than Fats – or swing a band better than he could. I never get tired of him. Fats has been with me from the first, and he'll be with me as long as I live."

Actor and band leader Conrad Janis also did a lot to keep the stride piano music of "Fats" Waller and James P. Johnson alive. In 1949, as an 18-year-old, Janis put together a band of aging jazz greats, consisting of James P. Johnson (piano), Henry Goodwin (trumpet), Edmond Hall (clarinet), Pops Foster (bass) and Baby Dodds (drums), with Janis on trombone.

In popular culture
 Waller is the subject of the Irish poet Michael Longley's "Elegy for Fats Waller".
 Waller's version of "Louisiana Fairytale" was used for many years as the theme song to the American television series This Old House.
 Waller's church organ music featured prominently in David Lynch's film Eraserhead in 1977.
 A fake documentary of Waller's life was featured prominently in Michel Gondry's film Be Kind Rewind in 2008.
 The story of Fats Waller's performance at Al Capone's birthday party was told in the Mysteries at the Museum Season 21 episode "Columbus and the Mermaid, Skyscraper Snafu and Stealing the Show".
 Thin Lizzy's 1981 album Renegade has a song called 'Fats' written about Waller.
 The story of Fats Waller is retold as "The Shy Boy" in the weekly Destination Freedom radio drama.

Key recordings
Source:

Filmography
Source:

See also
 List of ragtime composers
 Cotton Club

References

Further reading
 Machlin, Paul S., ed. (2001). Thomas Wright "Fats" Waller: Performances in Transcription, 1927–1943. Music of the United States of America (MUSA), vol. 10. Madison, Wisconsin: A-R Editions.
 Taylor, Stephen (2006). Fats Waller on the Air: The Radio Broadcasts & Discography. Lanham: Scarecrow Press. .

External links
 Fats Waller piano rollography
 Red Hot Jazz, a selection of Fats Waller's Recordings
 Fats Waller Forever , a digital exhibit of Fats Waller's musical career
 Fats Waller at Music of the United States of America (MUSA)
 Fats Waller memorabilia
 [ Allmusic]
 Fats Waller, the King of Stride, Welcome on this site dedicated to Fats Waller (English/French)
 Fats Waller recordings at the Discography of American Historical Recordings.

1904 births
1943 deaths
Swing pianists
Stride pianists
Jive singers
African-American jazz composers
African-American jazz pianists
American jazz organists
Broadway composers and lyricists
American male organists
American jazz songwriters
Big band bandleaders
Musicians from Queens, New York
Grammy Lifetime Achievement Award winners
Vaudeville performers
Gennett Records artists
RCA Victor artists
Ragtime composers
Deaths from pneumonia in Missouri
20th-century jazz composers
20th-century American pianists
DeWitt Clinton High School alumni
American jazz singers
Jazz musicians from New York (state)
20th-century organists
Baptists from New York (state)
American male pianists
American male jazz composers
American jazz composers
People from St. Albans, Queens
20th-century American keyboardists
HighNote Records artists
20th-century Baptists
African-American male singer-songwriters
20th-century African-American male singers
Singer-songwriters from New York (state)